Henri Lepage may refer to:

 Henri Lepage (director) (1898-1970), French film director
 Henri Lepage (economist) (born 1941), French economist
 Henri Lepage (fencer) (1908–1996), French Olympic fencer